Sztabin  - is a village in Augustów County, Podlaskie Voivodeship, in north-eastern Poland. It is the seat of the gmina (administrative district) called Gmina Sztabin.

The village has a population of 920.

History
The territories of the present Sztabin Commune were once inhabited by the Yotvingians. In 1506, King Alexander Jagiellon gave a part of this land to the Chreptowicz family.

The village was founded by Adam Chreptowicz before 1598, at the river crossing, on the route from Augustów to Knyszyn. At the beginning of its existence, it was called Osinki for over a century and a half.

In 1627, a Uniate church was built here from the Adam Chreptowicz foundation, which stood in the place of the Orthodox chapel founded in 1513 by Teodor Chreptowicz. Around 1656, the church was renamed the Roman Catholic church

The name Sztabin was introduced in 1760 by Joachim Chreptowicz, Chancellor of the Grand Duchy of Lithuania. He marked out a triangular market and a network of streets. The settlement became the main shopping center of Krasnoborski estates (Chreptowicz, and later Brzostowski). At the end of the 17th century, it began to transform into an urban center. In 1766 Sztabin obtained the royal privilege for fairs and fairs.

The town is known mainly for the social and economic experiments of Count Karol Brzostowski. In the 1820s he founded the so-called the Republic of China. He freed the peasants from serfdom, set up a school and introduced compulsory free education in his estates, modernized agriculture (introduced crop rotation and new tools), built a hospital to which he brought a doctor, introduced a penal code, founded a savings and loan fund. He built a glassworks, a brickyard, a sawmill, and a cast iron factory (he built a turf ore remelting furnace), bringing the declining estate to flourish. Thanks to him, a parish was established in 1895, and a marina at Biebrza was built.

After his death (1854) he gave his property to peasants in a perpetual lease, but the Russian authorities annulled his will. Sztabin slowly lost its importance and in 1897 he was deprived of city rights.

Sztabin's population took an active part in the national liberation struggles. During the January Uprising, a branch of colonel Konstanty Ramotowski "Wawr" operated in the area, whose camp at the Goat Market in the Augustów Forest was the site of one of the major battles in this region.

According to the 1921 Census, Sztabin was inhabited by 500 people, among whom 437 were Roman Catholic, 1 Orthodox and 62 Mosaic. At the same time, all residents declared Polish nationality. There were 83 residential buildings in the village.

References

Sztabin
Suwałki Governorate
Białystok Voivodeship (1919–1939)
Belastok Region